

Mailoc or Maeloc was a 6th-century bishop of Britonia, a settlement founded by expatriate Britons in Galicia, Spain. He represented his diocese, referred to as the Britonensis ecclesia or "Britonnic church", at the Second Council of Braga in 572. Records of the council refer to his see, the sedes Britonarum ("See of the Britons"), which may have been seated at the monastery of Saint Mary of Britonia. Mailoc's name is clearly Brythonic, deriving from the Celtic *Maglācos, thereby providing further evidence for the Britonnic presence in the area, but he is the only one to have a Celtic name.

See also
 Diocese of Ferrol-Mondoñedo (Formerly known as: Dioecesis Britoniensis).

Notes

References
Koch, John T. (2006). Celtic Culture: A Historical Encyclopedia. Santa Barbara: ABC-CLIO.
Richards, Melville, "Mailoc", Habis, III, 1972, p. 159. 
Tovar, António, "Un obispo con nombre británico y los orígenes de la diócesis de Mondoñedo", Habis, III, 1972, pp. 155–158.
Vives, J., Concilios visigóticos e hispano-romanos, Madrid, 1963.
Young, Simon, The Bishops of the early medieval diocese of Britonia (forthcoming).
Young, Simon, "Note on Britones in Thirteenth-century Galicia", Studia Celtica, XXXV (2001), pp. 361–2.
Young, Simon, "The Forgotten Colony", History Today, L, oct. 2000, pp. 5–6.

External links
  The Mindoniensis-Ferrolensis Province in the 21st Century (Alternatives: The Britonia Province)

6th-century Galician bishops
Sub-Roman Britons
6th-century English people